Sarmalele Reci (meaning "The Cold sarmale") is a Romanian rock band that was formed in 1993 in Bucharest.

History
The musical group Sarmalele Reci was initially formed by Florin Dumitrescu in 1993. Dumitrescu wanted to create a rock band that will have a Romanian name, because at that time Romanian bands usually had an American-English name.

The band members in 1993 were:

 Zoltán András - vocal, keyboards;
 Mihai Iordache - saxophone;
 Emil Viciu - guitar;
 Ciprian Voinea - bass guitar;
 Florin Ștefan - drums;
 Florin Dumitrescu - text composer.

Current members
 Zoltán András - vocals;
 Emil Viciu - guitars;
 Gabriel Drăgan - drums;
 Vladimir Săteanu - bass guitar;
 Mircea Horváth - keyboards.

Discography
1995 - Ţara te vrea prost (The State Wants You Stupid)
1996 - Aurolac (Junkie)
1998 - Bucate alese (Chosen Foods)
1999 - Răpirea din Serai (The Abduction from the Seraglio)
2001 - Maniac
2003 - Vaca (The Cow)
2007 - Adrian Băsescu
2009 - O seară la Operetă (A Night at the Operetta)
2012 - Haos.ro (Chaos.ro)

External links
  Official Website

Musical groups established in 1993
Romanian rock music groups
Musical groups from Bucharest